Sabo is a Singaporean web series which was launched in April 2015 and hosted by Mike Kasem. It is the first web series to be launched on Mediacorp interactive service Toggle, following the closure of xinmsn. The series is a reality hidden-camera show which pranks Mediacorp artistes and local celebs unsuspectingly.

Victims
Apart from episodes 7 and 9, which are rated PG13, all episodes are rated PG.

Reality web series